The Lambeth Articles of 1595 were a series of nine doctrinal statements intended to be an appendix to the Thirty-nine Articles of the Church of England. In response to a controversy over the Calvinist doctrine of predestination, the Lambeth Articles were created to clarify the church's official teaching. Because Queen Elizabeth I refused to authorise the articles, they never went into effect in England. However, they were adopted by the Church of Ireland in 1615.

Creation
During the reign of Elizabeth I, a Calvinist consensus developed among the leading clergy within the Church of England, specifically in regards to the doctrine of predestination. The church's doctrinal statement, the Thirty-nine Articles, addressed predestination in Article 17 "Of Predestination and Election". While Calvinists believed in double predestination (that God predestined some people for salvation but others for reprobation), Article 17 only endorsed election to salvation.  
 
An Arminian minority emerged in the universities (notably William Barret, Peter Baro, John Overall, and Antonio del Corro) and challenged the prevailing Calvinism. A controversy over predestination arose at Cambridge University. The Lambeth Articles (also known as the Nine Articles) were drafted by William Whitaker, Regius Professor of Divinity at Cambridge. He had been sent to Whitgift by the heads of Cambridge University, along with Humphrey Tyndal, Dean of Ely, in order to settle the controversy. The Articles were originally drafted by Whitaker and modified later by the bishops to make them more acceptable to anti-Calvinists. They were signed by Archbishop Whitgift, Richard Fletcher, Bishop of London, Richard Vaughan, Bishop elect of Bangor, and others.

The Lambeth Articles were not a replacement for the Thirty-nine Articles but were meant to officially align Article 17 to Calvinist theology.

Content
 The eternal election of some to life, and the reprobation of others to death.
 The moving cause of predestination to life is not the foreknowledge of faith and good works, but only the good pleasure of God.
 The number of the elect is unalterably fixed.
 Those who are not predestinated to life shall necessarily be damned for their sins.
 The true faith of the elect never fails finally nor totally.
 A true believer, or one furnished with justifying faith, has a full assurance and certainty of remission and everlasting salvation in Christ.
 Saving grace is not communicated to all men.
 No man can come to the Son unless the Father shall draw him, but all men are not drawn by the Father.
 It is not in every one's will and power to be saved.

Lack of authorisation
The Queen was unwilling to alter her Religious Settlement of 1559 and refused to assent to these new articles.

Church of Ireland
The Lambeth Articles were accepted at the 1615 Convocation of Dublin and consequently engrafted on the Irish Articles (written by James Ussher). One can find the basis of the Five Points of Calvinism contained in the Canons of Dort (1618–19) in the Lambeth Articles.

References

Notes

Bibliography

Further reading

External links
The Lambeth Articles

History of the Church of England
1595 in Christianity
Reformed confessions of faith